Web modeling (aka model-driven Web development) is a branch of Web engineering which addresses the specific issues related to design and development of large-scale Web applications. In particular, it focuses on the design notations and visual languages that can be used for the realization of robust, well-structured, usable and maintainable Web applications.
Designing a data-intensive Website amounts to specifying its characteristics in terms of various orthogonal abstractions. The main models that are involved in complex Web application design are: data structure, content composition, navigation paths, and presentation model.

Several languages and notations have been devised for Web application modeling. Among them:

 HDM — W2000
 RMM 
 OOHDM
 the Interaction Flow Modeling Language (IFML), adopted by the Object Management Group (OMG) in March 2013
 ARANEUS  
 STRUDEL   
 TIRAMISU  
 WebML
 Hera
 UML Web Application Extension
 UML-based Web Engineering (UWE)  
 ACE  
 WebArchitect  
 OO-H

One of the main discussion venues for this discipline is the Model-Driven Web Engineering Workshop (MDWE) held yearly in conjunction with the International Conference on Web Engineering (ICWE) conference.

Web design